Mary Cagle, also known as Cube Watermelon, is an American webcomic artist known for creating Kiwi Blitz, Let's Speak English, and Sleepless Domain.

Personal life
Cagle was raised in Corpus Christi, Texas and developed a strong interest in Japanese pop-culture, including both older and more modern anime and video games. In 2013, Cagle graduated from the Savannah College of Art and Design and became an English teacher at an elementary school in Kurihara, Japan. Cagle is asexual.

Works

Kiwi Blitz
In 2009, Cagle started the action/comedy webcomic Kiwi Blitz. Its plot follows a couple of teenagers attempting to fight crime in the pseudo-near future. Kiwi Blitz draws many of its influences from anime, featuring Americanized Japanese mecha designs. Brian Cronin of Comic Book Resources described the set-up of Kiwi Blitz as a "strong concept" that should be able to sustain itself for a long time. Praising the "interesting" cast, Cronin noted that Cagle is willing to "mix things up" so that story doesn't become stale. Lauren Davis of io9 listed Kiwi Blitz among her top ten superhero webcomics. The comic has been on hiatus since September 2021.

Let's Speak English
In November 2013, Cagle began illustrating her experiences of being an English teacher in Japan in the form of slice-of-life snippets. The webcomic, titled Let's Speak English, shows Cagle dealing with subjects such as Japanese pop-culture, toilets, thin walls, and the language barrier.

Sleepless Domain
Cagle started the webcomic Sleepless Domain in 2015. The story, set in a city that is invaded by malicious monsters on a nightly basis, features a group of magical girls and their interpersonal issues. Kotaku Australia described Sleepless Domain as a tragic story about the "loss of fellowship". Hachette began publishing a French-language physical release of the comic in 2018. In 2020, Seven Seas Entertainment announced a print and ebook release of the comic.

References

External links
  (Let's Speak English)
 Kiwi Blitz
 Sleepless Domain

1989 births
American webcomic creators
American female comics artists
Asexual women
Female comics writers
Living people
People from Corpus Christi, Texas
Savannah College of Art and Design alumni
Artists from Texas